Suite française (French Suite), FP 80, is an orchestral suite for wind instruments, percussion and harpsichord (or harp ad libitum) by Francis Poulenc. It was composed in a neoclassical style in 1935 for Édouard Bourdet's la Reine Margot, and it was inspired by Claude Gervaise's dance collection Le livre de danceries.

Structure 
 Bransle de Bourgogne
 Pavane
 Petite marche militaire
 Complainte
 Bransle de Champagne
 Sicilienne
 Carillon
 A typical performance lasts 14 minutes.

References

Sources 
 
 
 

Compositions by Francis Poulenc
1935 compositions
Orchestral suites